Daniel Currie (1935 – 1992) was a Scottish footballer who played as an inside right, primarily for Clyde, winning the Scottish Cup with the club in 1957–58, plus the Glasgow Merchants Charity Cup a month later, followed by the Glasgow Cup five months after that.

He also played at senior level for Queen of the South, played four times for the Scotland under-23 team and was selected for an international trial match in 1958 which led to him being placed on the shortlist for the 1958 FIFA World Cup squad, though ultimately he did not make the final pool.

He later emigrated to Canada with his family, playing for local teams in the Brantford, Ontario area. He died in 1992.

References

Date of birth uncertain
1935 births
1992 deaths
Soccer people from Ontario
Sportspeople from Brantford
Footballers from West Dunbartonshire
Association football inside forwards
Scottish footballers
Duntocher Hibernian F.C. players
Clyde F.C. players
Queen of the South F.C. players
Scottish Football League players
Scottish Junior Football Association players
Scotland under-23 international footballers
Scottish emigrants to Canada
People from Renton, West Dunbartonshire